The Protestant Standard, also published as The Protestant Banner, was a weekly English language newspaper published in Sydney, New South Wales, Australia.

History
The newspaper was first published in Sydney on 1 May 1869 by Samuel Goold, under the title of The Protestant Standard. The newspaper changed its name to The Protestant Banner and continued under this later title from 31 August 1895 to 28 July 1906.

Digitisation

The Protestant Standard (1869–1895) has been digitised as part of the Australian Newspapers Digitisation Program  of the National Library of Australia.

See also
 List of newspapers in Australia 
 List of newspapers in New South Wales

References

External links
 

Defunct newspapers published in New South Wales
Publications established in 1869
Publications disestablished in 1906